Mirela (also spelled Mirella) is a Southern and Eastern European feminine given name with a Latin origin. It is known as "the musical name" because it is made up of the notes of the scale: Mi, Re, and La. Its origin is the Italian version of the French and Occitan given names “Mireille” or "Mirèlha", related to the Occitan verb “mirar”, meaning "to look, to admire" which derives from the Latin "admīror", that means "admire, to respect, to appreciate". Notable persons with that name include:

Mirela Cabero García (born 1990), Spanish singer
Mirella Freni (born 1935), Italian operatic soprano
Mirella Bentivoglio (born 1922), Italian sculptor, poet, performance artist and curator 
Mirela Brekalo (born 1956), Croatian actress
Mirela Delibegovic, British virologist originally from Bosnia and Herzegovina 
Mirela Demireva (born 1989), Bulgarian high jumper
Mirela Dulgheru (born 1966), Romanian-Turkish Olympian long jumper
Mirela Holy (born 1971), Croatian politician
Mirela Maniani (born 1976), Greek Olympian track and field athlete 
Mirela Nichita-Pașca (born 1985), Romanian handballer
Mirela Roznoveanu (born 1947), Romanian-American literary critic, writer, and journalist
Mirela Rupic (born 1967), American costume and fashion designer
Mirela Țugurlan (born 1979), Romanian artistic gymnast
Mirela Oltean (born 1992), Romanian Clinic Manager

Romanian feminine given names